Geoffrey Hodson (12 March 1886 in Lincolnshire – 23 January 1983 in Auckland, New Zealand) was an occultist, Theosophist,Co-Freemason, mystic, Liberal Catholic priest, philosopher and esotericist, and a leading light for over 70 years in the Theosophical Society.

Early life
Hodson was educated in England.

According to Hodson, his occult experiences began when he was about five or six years old. He had dream experiences in the half waking state and this seemed to be connected with Kundalini, the power of life and one of the great forces also known as the "Serpent Fire".

He served in the British Army as an officer and tank commander during the First World War. Subsequently he spent his life as an anti-war activist through his teachings and insights. Following demobilisation he married Miss Jane Carter and he joined the YMCA Secretariat.

Angelic visionary
It was around this time he met Mary De La Middleton, who said that her own master, the Master Rakoczy, had instructed her to show him how to awaken clairvoyance when required, focus it at different levels, project energies and heal others. It was at this stage Geoffrey Hodson with his wife toured Lancashire on his motorcycle and sidecar making detailed notes on the various types of fairies and nature spirits there. This culminated when he was on holiday in the valley of Sheepscombe where he and his wife claimed to have studied the angelic kingdom and that he received teachings from a high angel. This was the beginning of his work with the angelic kingdom. He wrote many books about his investigations there and the angelic teachings given him throughout his life. Hodson was one of many (along with Arthur Conan Doyle) fooled by the Cottingley Fairies hoax.

South Africa, Australia and New Zealand
In 1937 he traveled to South Africa to stay with friends Mr and Mrs Quail and their daughter Ethelwynne, who was an artist. Under Hodson’s direction she painted the illustrations for his book, The Kingdom of the Gods. Hodson then went to Australia to be with his wife Jane, who since 1929 had progressive paralysis due to multiple sclerosis. She died in 1962. He served there as president of the Blavatsky Lodge, while a Perth theosophist Miss Sandra Chase took care of his wife. In 1940 he was invited by the New Zealand lodge to tour their main centres. While there he became founder and president of the New Zealand Vegetarian Society. He was also elected president of the Council of Combined Animal Welfare Organisations of New Zealand.

India and America
Hodson also served as the director of studies of the School of the Wisdom at the International Headquarters of the Theosophical Society at Adyar, Chennai in India, for four sessions, in 1953-54, then in 1954-1955 and again in 1961. Hodson was a guest lecturer at the Krotona School of Theosophy in Ojai, California.

Writing
Hodson was the author more than 50 books on spirituality, many being still in print. He wrote on psychic powers, Theosophy, Spiritualism, mysticism, fairies, angels, meditation, clairvoyance, health and disease.

He also wrote over two hundred articles and radio talks and travelled the world lecturing for the Theosophical Society.

He was awarded the Subba Row Gold Medal in 1954 for his contributions to Theosophical literature.

There are also several posthumous publications, such as Light of The Sanctuary - the Occult Diary of Geoffrey Hodson. Published by his wife Sandra Hodson.  Other books published based on his notes and diaries were: Yogic Ascent to Spiritual Heights, Illuminations of the Mystery Traditions.

Death
He gave his last lecture on 4 May 1982 at HPB Lodge in Auckland, aged 96. Eight months later he died in Auckland, on 23 January 1983.

Bibliography 
Works by Geoffrey Hodson:
 Faeries at Work and at Play, 1925
 The Kingdom of Faerie, 1927
 The Science of Seership 1927
 The Brotherhood of Angels and of Men, 1927
 First Steps on the Path, 1928
 The Angelic Hosts, 1928
 Be Ye Perfect, 1928
 Angels and the New Race, 1929
 American Lectures, 1929
 Thus Have I Heard, 1929
 The Miracle of Birth, 1929
 The Inner Side of Church Worship, 1930
 An Occult View of Health and Disease 1930
 New Light on the Problem of Disease 1930
 Some Experiments in Four Dimensional Vision, 1933
 The Coming of the Angels, 1935
 Destiny, 1936
 The Seven Human Temperaments, 1952
 Man, the Triune God, 1952
 Kingdom of the Gods, 1952
 Through the Gateway of Death: A Message to the Bereaved, 1953
 Theosophy Answers Some Problems of Life, 1953
 Pathway to Perfection, 1954
 Occult Powers in Nature and in Man, 1955
 Lecture Notes: The School of the Wisdom, 1955
 Vital Questions Answered, 1959
 The Soul's Awakening: Talks on Occultism and the Occult Life, 1963
 Hidden Wisdom in the Holy Bible, 1963–1980
 Man's Supersensory and Spiritual Powers, 1964
 Reincarnation, Fact or Fallacy?, 1967
 Meditations on the Occult Life, 1968
 The Supreme Splendour, 1967
 The Priestly Ideal, 1971
 The Call to the Heights: Guidance on the Pathway to Self-Illumination, 1975
 Christ Life from Nativity to Ascension, 1975
 Music Forms: Superphysical Effects of Music Clairvoyantly Observed, 1976
 At the Sign of the Square and Compass, 1976
 Clairvoyant Investigations of Christian Origins, 1977
 Basic Theosophy: The Living Wisdom (condensed from Lecture Notes), 1981
 The Concealed Wisdom in World Mythology, 1983
 Clairvoyant Investigations, 1984
 The Occult Philosophy Concealed within Freemasonry, 1985

Posthumus Publications: 
 Light of The Sanctuary - The Occult Diary of Geoffrey Hodson, 1988
 Yogic Ascent to Spiritual Heights, 1991
 Illuminations of The Mystery Tradition, 1992
 Sharing The Light - The collected Articles of Geoffrey Hodson, 2008
 An Introduction to The Initiate Life, 2018
 The Ancient Mysteries, 2020

See also 
 Cottingley Fairies

References

External links 

Comprehensive authority website by a pupil
Hodson biography, bibliography, digital library from TheLiberalCatholicChurch.org

Works
 The Seven Human Temperaments, online book
 Extracts from Light of the Sanctuary, the Occult Diary of Geoffrey Hodson
 , a Hodson work
 Angels and the New Race
 Clairvoyant Investigations

1886 births
1983 deaths
English Theosophists
Angelic visionaries
New Zealand Theosophists